Peter Roth (born January 30, 1961) is a German former alpine skier who competed for West Germany in the 1988 Winter Olympics and for Germany in the 1992 Winter Olympics and in the 1994 Winter Olympics.

He was born in Königsee.

In 1990 he won his only world cup slalom in New Zealand and finished twelfth in the 1991 slalom world cup.

His best Olympic performance was in 1992 when he finished 16th in the slalom event.

External links
 
 
 

1961 births
Living people
People from Königsee
German male alpine skiers
Olympic alpine skiers of West Germany
Olympic alpine skiers of Germany
Alpine skiers at the 1988 Winter Olympics
Alpine skiers at the 1992 Winter Olympics
Alpine skiers at the 1994 Winter Olympics
Sportspeople from Thuringia